There were ten special elections to the United States House of Representatives in 1933, to both the 72nd United States Congress and the 73rd United States Congress.

72nd United States Congress 

|-
! 
| Daniel E. Garrett
| 
| 1920
|  | Incumbent died December 13, 1932.New member elected January 28, 1933.Democratic hold.
| nowrap | 

|}

73rd United States Congress 

|-
! 
| John N. Garner
| 
| 1902
|  | Incumbent resigned March 3, 1933 to become U.S. Vice President.New member elected April 22, 1933.Democratic hold.
| nowrap | 

|-
! 
| Clay S. Briggs
| 
| 1918
|  | Incumbent died April 29, 1933.New member elected June 24, 1933.Democratic hold.
| nowrap | 

|-
! 
| Charles H. Brand
| 
| 1932
|  | Incumbent died May 17, 1933.New member elected July 5, 1933.Democratic hold.
| nowrap | 

|-
! 
| Lewis W. Douglas
| 
| 1926
|  | Incumbent resigned March 4, 1933 to become Director of the Office of Management and Budget.New member elected October 3, 1933.Democratic hold.
| nowrap | 

|-
! 
| Henry W. Watson
| 
| 1914
|  | Incumbent died August 27, 1933.New member elected November 7, 1933.Democratic gain.
| nowrap | 

|-
! 
| Edward B. Almon
| 
| 1914
|  | Incumbent died June 22, 1933.New member elected November 14, 1933.Democratic hold.
| nowrap | 

|-
! 
| Lynn Hornor
| 
| 1930
|  | Incumbent died September 23, 1933.New member elected November 28, 1933.Democratic hold.
| nowrap | 

|-
! 
| Heartsill Ragon
| 
| 1922
|  | Incumbent resigned June 16, 1933 to become judge of the U.S. District Court for the Western District of ArkansasNew member elected December 19, 1933.Democratic hold.
| nowrap | 

|-
! 
| John D. Clarke
| 
| 1926
|  | Incumbent died November 5, 1933.New member elected December 28, 1933.Republican hold.
| nowrap | 

|}

References 

 
1932